Râmnicu Sărat (also spelled Rîmnicu Sărat,  or Rebnick) is a city in Buzău County, Romania, in the historical region of Muntenia. It was first attested in a document of 1439, and raised to the rank of municipiu in 1994.

The city rises from a marshy plain, east of the Carpathians, and west of the cornlands of southern Moldavia. It lies on the left bank of the river Râmnicul Sărat. Salt and petroleum are worked in the mountains, and there is a considerable trade in agricultural produce and preserved meat.

Population

History
Râmnicu Sărat was the scene of battles between the Wallachians and Ottomans in 1634, 1434 and 1573.

It was also here that, in 1789 (during the Russo-Turkish War of 1787–1792), an army of Imperial Russian and Habsburg troops, commanded by Alexander Suvorov, defeated the Ottoman forces in the Battle of Rymnik. For this victory, Suvorov was awarded the victory title of "Count of Rymnik" or "Rimniksky" (граф Рымникский) by empress Catherine the Great of Russia.

In 1854 the city was almost destroyed by fire and was rebuilt. From 1901 to 1963, the Râmnicu Sărat prison operated in the city.

Educational institutions
 Alexandru Vlahuță National College

Natives

 Petre Antonescu 
 Mariana Bitang
 Romeo Bunică
 Kid Cann
 Nicolae Ciupercă
 Nicolae Fleva
 Ioan Glogojeanu
 Petre Iorgulescu-Yor
 Damian Militaru
 Nicolae Minovici
 Ștefan Minovici
 Costin Murgescu
 Leonida Nedelcu
 Eduard Nicola
 Adrian Oțoiu
 Ștefan Petrescu
 Traian Săvulescu
 Saul Steinberg
 Nicu Stoian
 Marius Tigoianu

Gallery

References

 
Cities in Romania
Localities in Muntenia
Capitals of former Romanian counties
Shtetls
Populated places in Buzău County